Massachusetts House of Representatives' 9th Essex district in the United States is one of 160 legislative districts included in the lower house of the Massachusetts General Court. It covers part of Essex County. Republican Donald Wong of Saugus has represented the district since 2011.

Locales represented
The district includes the following localities:
 part of Lynn
 part of Saugus
 part of Wakefield

The current district geographic boundary overlaps with those of the Massachusetts Senate's 3rd Essex and 5th Middlesex districts.

Former locale
The district previously covered Rockport, circa 1872.

Representatives
 Joseph Ross, circa 1858 
 Ebenezer Cogswell, circa 1859 
 Caleb Jerome Norwood, circa 1888 
 James W. Robertson, circa 1920 
 Everett Breed Bacheller, circa 1951 
 Julie Gilligan, 1961-1968
 J. Michael Ruane, circa 1975 
 Belden Bly
 Steven Angelo
 Mark Falzone
 Donald H. Wong, 2011-current

See also
 List of Massachusetts House of Representatives elections
 Other Essex County districts of the Massachusetts House of Representatives: 1st, 2nd, 3rd, 4th, 5th, 6th, 7th, 8th, 10th, 11th, 12th, 13th, 14th, 15th, 16th, 17th, 18th
 Essex County districts of the Massachusett Senate: 1st, 2nd, 3rd; 1st Essex and Middlesex; 2nd Essex and Middlesex
 List of Massachusetts General Courts
 List of former districts of the Massachusetts House of Representatives

Images

References

External links
 Ballotpedia
  (State House district information based on U.S. Census Bureau's American Community Survey).

House
Government of Essex County, Massachusetts